Anamoe  (foaled 16 November 2018) is a nine-time  Group 1 winning Australian thoroughbred racehorse.

Background

A homebred for Godolphin, Anamoe is a half-brother to Irish stakes-winner Anamba and is out of the 2007 Australasian Oaks winner Anamato.

Racing career

2020/21: two-year-old season
Anamoe finished fifth in his race debut in the Listed Debutant Stakes at Caulfield in October 2020, before opening his account in the Listed Merson Cooper Stakes at Sandown a month later.  Winning jockey Damien Oliver said after the win,
"That was a nice effort. He's a nice horse with ability".

After a third placing in the Blue Diamond Stakes, Anamoe travelled to Sydney and won the Todman Stakes.  He then finished in second placing in the Golden Slipper before winning the Group 1 Sires' Produce Stakes at Randwick.

2021/22: three-year-old season

Anamoe resumed racing as a three-year-old on the 11 September 2021 at Kembla Grange in The Run to the Rose.  He won the race by a neck margin with his jockey James McDonald stating afterwards "He has a tremendous will to win this horse. I knew once he was in his eyesight (of the leader) he would get him."

After going under by a short margin in the Golden Rose a fortnight later, Anamoe was sent to Caulfield to contest the Caulfield Guineas on the 9 October 2021. Starting the $2.10 favourite, jockey Damien Oliver positioned the three-year-old colt perfectly after contending with a wide barrier.  In the straight he launched a barnstorming finish over the final 200m to win by a half a length.  Oliver said after the race, "He’s a magnificent horse. He’s like a lot of good horses, he knows he’s good, pricks his ears for the camera.”

On 23 October Anamoe was placed second in the Cox Plate behind State Of Rest with Verry Elleegant third.  Anamoe's jockey Craig Williams protested against the result due to interference, however the objection was controversially dismissed by stewards.

Anamoe raced again on the 29 January 2022 in the Expressway Stakes over 1,200 metres at Rosehill, where he finished in third place beaten less than one length. 

He raced again three weeks later at Rosehill and this time was successful in the Hobartville Stakes over 1,400 metres.

After finishing a close second at his next start in the Randwick Guineas, Anamoe then contested the Rosehill Guineas over 2,000 metres on the 19 March.  Starting the $1.70 favourite, Anamoe comfortably won the race by six-and-a-half lengths.

Anamoe next contested the Queen Elizabeth Stakes but finished in last place due to the heavy track conditions.

2022/23: four-year-old season

Anamoe resumed from a break and won his fourth Group 1 race when successful in the 2022 Winx Stakes.

Pedigree

References 

Australian racehorses
Racehorses bred in Australia
Racehorses trained in Australia
2018 racehorse births
Thoroughbred family 18